Félix Auger-Aliassime was the defending champion but chose not to defend his title.

Kimmer Coppejans won the title after defeating Alex Molčan 7–6(7–2), 6–1 in the final.

Seeds

Draw

Finals

Top half

Bottom half

References
Main Draw
Qualifying Draw

Copa Sevilla - Singles
2018 Singles